Ajo Colluna (possibly from Quechua aqu sand, kulluna washbowl; silo, "sand bowl" or "sand silo") is a  mountain in the Chila mountain range in the Andes of Peru. It is located in the Arequipa Region, Caylloma Province, on the border of the districts of Lari and Tuti. It lies northeast of Quehuisha and Mismi.

References

Mountains of Peru
Mountains of Arequipa Region